The 1965–66 Illinois Fighting Illini men's basketball team represented the University of Illinois.

Regular season
Harry Combes entered his 19th season as the head coach of the Fighting Illini.  The program was heading in a positive direction with six up-and-coming sophomores joining a varsity team that already included five juniors and five seniors.  This balance was demonstrated within the starting lineup which included a rotation of two sophomores, two juniors and two seniors.  The starters included, Don Freeman and Rich Jones as forwards, Preston Pearson and Bob Brown as guards, and Ron Dunlap at center.

It was during this season that Freeman would mark his place in Illini history by setting a record for most points in a season (668), while averaging 27.8 points per game.  When he finished at Illinois, he had totaled 1449 points and averaged 20.1 points and 10.3 rebounds per game over his three varsity seasons. This offensive output led to Freeman being named a 1st-team All-American by the Helms Foundation, a 2nd-team All-American by Converse and Basketball News, and honorable mention with UPI,

Roster

Source

Schedule
												
Source																
												

|-			
!colspan=12 style="background:#DF4E38; color:white;"| Non-Conference regular season									

|-
!colspan=9 style="background:#DF4E38; color:#FFFFFF;"|Big Ten regular season

|-

Player stats

Awards and honors
Don Freeman
Team Most Valuable Player 
1st team All-American (Helms)
2nd team All-American (Converse)
2nd team All-American (Basketball News)
Honorable Mention All-American (UPI)
Rich Jones
Honorable Mention All-American (Converse)

Team players drafted into the NBA

Rankings

References

Illinois Fighting Illini
Illinois Fighting Illini men's basketball seasons
1965 in sports in Illinois
1966 in sports in Illinois